Agriculture contributes towards climate change through greenhouse gas emissions and by the conversion of non-agricultural land such as forests into agricultural land. The agriculture, forestry and land use sector contribute between 13% and 21% of global greenhouse gas emissions. Emissions of nitrous oxide, methane make up over half of total greenhouse gas emission from agriculture. Animal husbandry is a major source of greenhouse gas emissions.

The agricultural food system is responsible for a significant amount of greenhouse gas emissions. In addition to being a significant user of land and consumer of fossil fuel, agriculture contributes directly to greenhouse gas emissions through practices such as rice production and the raising of livestock. The three main causes of the increase in greenhouse gases observed over the past 250 years have been fossil fuels, land use, and agriculture. Farm animal digestive systems can be put into two categories: monogastric and ruminant. Ruminant cattle for beef and dairy rank high in greenhouse-gas emissions; monogastric, or pigs and poultry-related foods, are low. The consumption of the monogastric types may yield less emissions. Monogastric animals have a higher feed-conversion efficiency, and also do not produce as much methane. Furthermore,  is actually re-emitted into the atmosphere by plant and soil respiration in the later stages of crop growth, causing more greenhouse gas emissions. The amount of greenhouse gases produced during the manufacture and use of nitrogen fertilizer is estimated as around 5% of anthropogenic greenhouse gas emissions. The single most important way to cut emissions from it is to use less fertilizers, while increasing the efficiency of their use.

There are many strategies that can be used to help soften the effects, and the further production of greenhouse gas emissions - this is also referred to as climate-smart agriculture. Some of these strategies include a higher efficiency in livestock farming, which includes management, as well as technology; a more effective process of managing manure; a lower dependence upon fossil-fuels and nonrenewable resources; a variation in the animals' eating and drinking duration, time and location; and a cutback in both the production and consumption of animal-sourced foods. A range of policies may reduce greenhouse gas emissions from the agriculture sector for a more sustainable food system.

Overview 
Agricultural activities emit the greenhouse gases carbon dioxide, nitrous oxide, and methane.

Carbon dioxide emissions 
Activities such as tilling of fields, planting of crops, and shipment of products cause carbon dioxide emissions. Agriculture-related emissions of carbon dioxide account for around 11% of global greenhouse gas emissions. Farm practices such as reducing tillage, decreasing empty land, returning biomass residue of crop to soil, and increasing the use of cover crops can reduce carbon emissions.

Methane emissions 

Methane emissions from livestock are the number one contributor to agricultural greenhouse gases globally. Livestock are responsible for 14.5% of total anthropogenic greenhouse gas emissions. One cow alone will emit 220 pounds of methane per year. While the residence time of methane is much shorter than that of carbon dioxide, it is 28 times more capable of trapping heat. Not only do livestock contribute to harmful emissions, but they also require a lot of land and may overgraze, which leads to unhealthy soil quality and reduced species diversity. A few ways to reduce methane emissions include switching to plant-rich diets with less meat, feeding the cattle more nutritious food, manure management, and composting.

Traditional rice cultivation is the second biggest agricultural methane source after livestock, with a near-term warming impact equivalent to the carbon-dioxide emissions from all aviation. Government involvement in agricultural policy is limited due to high demand for agricultural products like corn, wheat, and milk. The United States Agency for International Development's (USAID) global hunger and food security initiative, the Feed the Future project, is addressing food loss and waste. By addressing food loss and waste, greenhouse gas emission mitigation is also addressed. By only focusing on dairy systems of 20 value chains in 12 countries, food loss and waste could be reduced by 4-10%. These numbers are impactful and would mitigate greenhouse gas emissions while still feeding the population.

Nitrous oxide emissions 
Nitrous oxide emission comes from the increased use of synthetic and organic fertilizers. Fertilizers increase crop yield production and allows the crops to grow at a faster rate. Agricultural emissions of nitrous oxide make up 6% of the United States' greenhouse gas emissions; they have increased in concentration by 30% since 1980. While 6% may appear to be a small contribution, nitrous oxide is 300 times more effective at trapping heat per pound than carbon dioxide and has a residence time of around 120 years. Different management practices such as conserving water through drip irrigation, monitoring soil nutrients to avoid overfertilization, and using cover crops in place of fertilizer application may help in reducing nitrous oxide emissions.

Land use 

Agriculture contributes to greenhouse gas increases through land use in four main ways:
 CO2 releases linked to deforestation
 Methane releases from rice cultivation
 Methane releases from enteric fermentation in cattle
 Nitrous oxide releases from fertilizer application

Together, these agricultural processes comprise 54% of methane emissions, roughly 80% of nitrous oxide emissions, and virtually all carbon dioxide emissions tied to land use.

Land cover has changed majorly since 1750, as humans have deforested temperate regions. When forests and woodlands are cleared to make room for fields and pastures, the albedo of the affected area increases, which can result in either warming or cooling effects depending on local conditions. Deforestation also affects regional carbon reuptake, which can result in increased concentrations of CO2, the dominant greenhouse gas. Land-clearing methods such as slash and burn compound these effects, as the burning of biomatter directly releases greenhouse gases and particulate matter such as soot into the air. Land clearing can destroy the soil carbon sponge.

Rice production

Livestock 

Livestock and livestock-related activities such as deforestation and increasingly fuel-intensive farming practices are responsible for over 18% of human-made greenhouse gas emissions, including:
 9% of global carbon dioxide emissions
 35–40% of global methane emissions (chiefly due to enteric fermentation and manure)
 64% of global nitrous oxide emissions (chiefly due to fertilizer use.)

Livestock activities also contribute disproportionately to land-use effects, since crops such as corn and alfalfa are cultivated in order to feed the animals.

In 2010, enteric fermentation accounted for 43% of the total greenhouse gas emissions from all agricultural activity in the world. The meat from ruminants has a higher carbon equivalent footprint than other meats or vegetarian sources of protein based on a global meta-analysis of lifecycle assessment studies. Methane production by animals, principally ruminants, makes up an estimated 15-20% global production of methane.

Worldwide, livestock production occupies 70% of all land used for agriculture, or 30% of the land surface of the Earth. The way livestock is grazed also affects future fertility of the land.  Not circulating grazing can lead to unhealthy compacted soils.  The expansion of livestock farms affects the habitats of native wildlife and has led to their decline.

The Stockholm Environment Institute has suggested that livestock subsidies be phased out in a just transition.

Fertilizer production

Soil erosion 

Large scale farming can cause large amounts of soil erosion. 25 to 40 percent of eroded soil ends up in water sources. Soil that carries pesticides and fertilizers pollutes the bodies of water it enters. In the United States and Europe especially, large-scale agriculture has grown and small-scale-agriculture has shrunk due to financial arrangements such as contract farming. Bigger farms tend to favour monocultures, overuse water resources, and accelerate deforestation and soil quality decline. A study from 2020 by the International Land Coalition, together with Oxfam and World Inequality Lab, found that 1% of land owners manage 70% of the world's farmland. The highest discrepancy can be found in Latin America, where the poorest 50% own just 1% of the land. Small landowners, as individuals or families, tend to be more cautious in land use compared to large landowners. As of 2020, however, the proportion of small landowners has been decreasing since the 1980s. Currently, the largest share of smallholdings can be found in Asia and Africa.

Global estimates 
 
Between 2010 and 2019, agriculture, forestry and land use contributed between 13% and 21% to global greenhouse gas emissions. Nitrous oxide and methane make up over half of total greenhouse gas emissions from agriculture.

In 2020, it was estimated that the food system as a whole contributed 37% of total greenhouse gas emissions, and that this figure was on course to increase by 30–40% by 2050 due to population growth and dietary change.

Older estimates 
In 2010, agriculture, forestry and land-use change were estimated to contribute 20–25% of global annual emissions.

Mitigation

In developed countries 
Agriculture is often not included in government emissions reductions plans. For example, the agricultural sector is exempt from the EU emissions trading scheme which covers around 40% of the EU greenhouse gas emissions.

Several mitigation measures for use in developed countries have been proposed:

 breeding more resilient crop varieties, and diversification of crop species
 using improved agroforestry species
 capture and retention of rainfall, and use of improved irrigation practices
 Increasing forest cover and Agroforestry
 use of emerging water harvesting techniques (such as contour trenching)

In developing countries 
The Intergovernmental Panel on Climate Change (IPCC) has reported that agriculture is responsible for over a quarter of total global greenhouse gas emissions. Given that agriculture's share in global gross domestic product (GDP) is about 4%, these figures suggest that agricultural activities produce high levels of greenhouse gases. Innovative agricultural practices and technologies can play a role in climate change mitigation and adaptation. This adaptation and mitigation potential is nowhere more pronounced than in developing countries where agricultural productivity remains low; poverty, vulnerability and food insecurity remain high; and the direct effects of climate change are expected to be especially harsh. Creating the necessary agricultural technologies and harnessing them to enable developing countries to adapt their agricultural systems to changing climate will require innovations in policy and institutions as well.  In this context, institutions and policies can play an important role at multiple scales.

Travis Lybbert and Daniel Sumner suggest six policy principles:
 The best policy and institutional responses will enhance information flows, incentives and flexibility.
 Policies and institutions that promote economic development and reduce poverty will often improve agricultural adaptation and may also pave the way for more effective climate change mitigation through agriculture.
 'Business as usual' among the world's poor is not adequate.
 Existing technology options must be made more available and accessible without overlooking complementary capacity and investments.
 Adaptation and mitigation in agriculture will require local responses, but effective policy responses must also reflect global impacts and inter-linkages.
 Trade will play a critical role in both mitigation and adaptation, but will itself be shaped importantly by climate change.

State- or NGO-sponsored projects can help farmers be more resilient to climate change, such as irrigation infrastructure that provides a dependable water source as rains become more erratic. Water catchment systems that collect water during the rainy season to be used during dry periods can also be used to mitigate the effects of climate change. Some programs, like the Asociación de Cooperación para el Desarrollo Rural de Occidente (C.D.R.O.), a Guatemalan program funded by the United States’ government until 2017, focus on agroforestry and weather monitoring systems to help farmers adapt. The organization provided residents with resources to plant new, more adaptable crops to alongside their typical maize to protect the corn from variable temperatures, frost, etc. C.D.R.O. also set up a weather monitoring system to help predict extreme weather events, and would send residents text messages to warn them about periods of frosts, extreme heat, humidity, or drought. Projects focusing on irrigation, water catchment, agroforestry, and weather monitoring can help Central American residents adapt to climate change.

The Agricultural Model Intercomparison and Improvement Project (AgMIP) was developed in 2010 to evaluate agricultural models and intercompare their ability to predict climate impacts. In sub-Saharan Africa and South Asia, South America and East Asia, AgMIP regional research teams (RRTs) are conducting integrated assessments to improve understanding of agricultural impacts of climate change (including biophysical and economic impacts) at national and regional scales. Other AgMIP initiatives include global gridded modeling, data and information technology (IT) tool development, simulation of crop pests and diseases, site-based crop-climate sensitivity studies, and aggregation and scaling.

At the 2019 United Nations Climate Summit, the Global EverGreening Alliance announced an initiative to promote agroforestry and conservation farming. One of its goals is to sequester carbon from the atmosphere. The coalition aims to restore tree cover to a territory of 5.75 million square kilometres, achieve a healthy tree-grass balance on a territory of 6.5 million square kilometres, and increase carbon capture in a territory of 5 million square kilometres.By 2050 the restored land should sequester 20 billion tons of carbon annually. The first phase of the initiative is the "Grand African Savannah Green Up" project. In 2019, millions of families had already implemented these methods, and the average territory covered with trees in the farms in Sahel reached 16%.

Climate-smart agriculture

See also 

 Agroecology
 Climate change and fisheries
 Climate change and meat production
 Effects of climate change on agriculture
 Environmental issues with agriculture
 Slash-and-char

References

Works cited

External links 
 Climate change on the Food and Agriculture Organization of the United Nations website.
 Report on the relationship between climate change, agriculture and food security by the International Food Policy Research Institute
 Climate Change, Rice and Asian Agriculture: 12 Things to Know Asian Development Bank

 
Greenhouse gas emissions